The current Dutch railway signalling system operated by ProRail has been in effect since 1954 on the Dutch Railways network 

It was designed to be one of the simplest in Europe and is integrated to the ATB, the system of cab signalling widespread on the Dutch network.

Dutch trains normally use the right-hand track and the signals are placed at the right of the track; in sections also equipped to run on the left track, the signals are placed on the left.

Light signals
Below are common forms:
 raised (hooggeplaatst) signal, can be used anywhere;
 ground (laaggeplaatst) or dwarf (dwergsein) signal, used in areas where speeds do not exceed 40 km/h (do not have numeric display)
 distant signal (voorsein).

Their aspects are categorized according to the colour. (There is never more than one colour at a time):

Green Aspect

Yellow Aspect

Red Aspect

Speed displays

See also 
Automatische treinbeïnvloeding, also known as ATB

External links 
all Dutch railway signals (in dutch)

Netherlands